Temnocephala lamothei is a species of flatworm in the family Temnocephalidae.

The specific name lamothei is in honor of Mexican helminthologist Dr. Marcos Rafael Lamothe-Argumedo.

This species was collected in 2005  in Misiones Province, Argentina and described in 2008 as a commensal in the mantle cavity of freshwater snail Pomella megastoma.

References 

Turbellaria
Animals described in 2008